is a passenger railway station located in the city of Yokkaichi, Mie Prefecture, Japan, operated by the private railway operator Sangi Railway.

Lines
Hokusei Chūō Kōenguchi Station is served by the Sangi Line, and is located 11.2 kilometres from the terminus of the line at Kintetsu-Tomida Station.

Layout
The station consists of a single side platform serving bi-directional traffic.

Platforms

Adjacent stations

History
It was renamed to its present name on April 1, 1997 when the station was reconstructed 100 meters in the direction of Tomida.

Passenger statistics
In fiscal 2019, the station was used by an average of 285 passengers daily (boarding passengers only).

Surrounding area
Prefectural Hokusei Chuo Park (about 20 minutes on foot)
Takamidai (residential area)

See also
List of railway stations in Japan

References

External links

Sangi Railway official home page

Railway stations in Japan opened in 1931
Railway stations in Mie Prefecture
Yokkaichi